The Forbidden Plateau is a small, hilly plateau in the east of the Vancouver Island Ranges in British Columbia, northwest of Comox Lake roughly between Mount Albert Edward to the southwest and Mount Washington to the northeast.

Geography
The plateau features gently sloping sub-alpine terrain broken up by small, rugged hills and pitted with small lakes. Much of it is contained within Strathcona Provincial Park, and a network of trails facilitate hiking, cross country skiing, and access to Mount Albert Edward.

A sub-alpine meadow on Mount Becher in the southwest corner of the plateau is one of only a few sites in Canada of the Olympic onion (Allium crenulatum).

Geology
The plateau was the epicentre of the 1946 Vancouver Island earthquake that registered 7.3 on the Richter magnitude scale, the strongest ever recorded on land in Canada.

The legend
According to the popular, though disproven, legend, when the K'ómoks faced raids from other coastal tribes, they took their women and children to the plateau for safekeeping. During a raid by the Cowichan, the women and children vanished without a trace. When a member of the tribe went looking for the women and children within the Forbidden Plateau, he found red lichen covering the snow and nearby rocks and assumed the lichen to be blood from the family members. Since then, the plateau became taboo for it was believed that it was inhabited by evil spirits who had consumed those they had sent. 

This legend, however, has no basis in K'ómoks history, a fact which has been documented by sources such as Comox Valley environmentalist Ruth Masters and Pat Trask, curator at the Courtenay Museum. Clinton Wood and Ben Hughes appear to be the creators of the false legend, the first record of which can be found in an article by Hughes in The Province newspaper in 1927. In a book published in 1967, Wood takes credit for the legend, stating that he believed a bit of mystery would help publicize the attraction of the plateau.

See also
Comox Glacier
Panther Lake

Notes and references

Further reading 
 Jenny Clayton, Alpine Island From the Forbidden Plateau to Mount Washington, skiing on central Vancouver Island dates to the 1920s

External links

Alberni Valley
Canadian legends
Plateaus of British Columbia
Reportedly haunted locations in British Columbia
Strathcona Provincial Park
Vancouver Island Ranges